Archiv der Mathematik is a peer-reviewed mathematics journal published by Springer, established in 1948.

Abstracting and indexing
The journal is abstracted and indexed in:
 Mathematical Reviews
 Zentralblatt MATH
 Scopus
 SCImago

According to the Journal Citation Reports, the journal has a 2020 impact factor of 0.608.

References

External links

Mathematics journals
Publications established in 1948
English-language journals
Springer Science+Business Media academic journals
Monthly journals